Nuspirit Helsinki is the self-titled debut from Nuspirit Helsinki.

Track listing 
 Honest – 3:59
 Subzero – 5:58
 Trying – 7:29
 Silent Steps – 4:27
 Circular Motion – 7:24
 Hard Like a Rock (Nuspirit Emorph) – 6:33
 String Interlude – 0:48
 Orson (Album Mix) – 6:33
 I Wonder (2:14 AM) – 4:50
 Montana Roja – 0:36
 Seis Por Ocho (Original Jazz Session Mix) – 6:14
 Skydive – 10:03
 Skydive Outro – 0:47

2002 debut albums